Kellogg School may refer to:

 Kellogg School of Management at Northwestern University
 Kellogg School of Science and Technology at The Scripps Research Institute
 Kellogg College, Oxford, one of the constituent colleges of Oxford University
 Kellogg Community College campuses in southwest Michigan
 Kellogg Middle School, a school in the Shoreline School District
 Kellogg School, a school in Goleta Union School District
 The Hyde, a neighborhood in Wichita, Kansas